Everest Ascent is a text and graphics adventure game for the ZX Spectrum and Commodore 64 computers. It was published by Richard Shepherd Software in 1984. The goal is to reach the top of Mount Everest in 20 days.  Players must allocate their limited funds to keep their sherpas well fed and supplied in order to reach the summit.

References

External links

1983 video games
Adventure games
Commodore 64 games
Mount Everest in fiction
Richard Shepherd Software games
Single-player video games
Video games developed in the United Kingdom
ZX Spectrum games